The following outline is provided as an overview of and topical guide to alchemy:

Alchemy – A philosophical tradition recognized as protoscience, that includes the application of Hermetic principles, and practices related to mythology, religion, and spirituality.

Branches

Alchemy and chemistry in medieval Islam
Chinese Alchemy
Neidan
Processing (Chinese materia medica)
Iatrochemistry
Spagyric
New Age
Psychoanalysis
Analytical psychology
Individuation
Metacognition
Rasayana

Influences

Influences upon alchemy – alchemy developed dependent on a number of influences and experienced regional and period-specific variations:
Aristotelianism
Esotericism
Western Esotericism
Esoteric Christianity
Gnosticism
Hermeticism
Humorism
Metallurgy
History of metallurgy in the Indian subcontinent
Platonism
Neoplatonism
Pseudoscience
Pythagoreanism
Taoism
Stoicism

Related fields
Anthroposophy
Astrology
Ayurveda
Homeopathy
Kayaku-Jutsu
Magic, magick
Moxibustion
Tay al-Ard
Yoga Nidra

Concepts 

Alchemical elements – Primarily the four Classical elements of:
 Fire (classical element)
 Water (classical element)
 Earth (classical element)
 Air (classical element)
 For variations see: Wu Xing • Mahābhūta • Five elements (Japanese philosophy)
Alchemy in art and entertainment
Alkahest
Anima mundi
Chrysopoeia
Filius philosophorum
Takwin
Homunculus
Philosopher's stone
Cintamani
Elixir of life
Panacea
Prima materia
Yliaster
Septenary of the seven metals and Classical planets in Western alchemy
 Lead • tin • copper • iron • mercury • silver • gold
 Saturn • Jupiter • Venus • Mars • Mercury • Moon • Sun
Tria Prima (three primes) 
 Salt • mercury • sulfur
 Body • soul • spirit
Unity of opposites or coincidentia oppositorum
Hieros Gamos
Rebis

Processes
Magnum opus – great work of alchemy consisting of:
Nigredo 
Albedo  
Citrinitas (sometimes excluded)
Rubedo

Alchemists also engaged in practical and symbolic processes including:
Calcination 
Ceration 
Cohobation 
Congelation
Digestion 
Distillation 
Fermentation 
Filtration 
Fixation 
Multiplication 
Projection
Solution 
Sublimation

Symbolism

Alchemical symbol – 

1. Glyphs
AGLA
Monas Hieroglyphica
2. Imagery
Suns in alchemy
Undine (alchemy)
3. Visual Symbolism
Porta Alchemica
Serpent (symbolism)
Caduceus
Ouroboros
Nehushtan

Scientific connections 
 
Biological transmutation
Chemistry
Historicism
Nuclear transmutation
Obsolete scientific theories
Physics
Scientific method
Synthesis of noble metals

Substances of the alchemists 

phosphorus • sulfur (sulphur) • arsenic • antimony
vitriol • quartz • cinnabar • pyrites • orpiment • galena
magnesia • lime • potash • natron • saltpetre • kohl
ammonia • ammonium chloride • alcohol • camphor
sulfuric acid (sulphuric acid) • hydrochloric acid • nitric acid • acetic acid • formic acid • citric acid • tartaric acid
aqua regia • gunpowder
blue vitriol • green vitriol • vinegar • salt
more...

Apparatus
Stills
Alembic
Retort
Retort stand

Vessels
Aludel
Crucible
Hessian crucible
Cupels
Mortar and pestle

Heating devices
Athanor
Bain-marie
Sand bath

Alchemy organizations 
Bibliotheca Philosophica Hermetica
European Society for the Study of Western Esotericism
Freemasonry
Rosicrucianism

Alchemical texts 
Axiom of Maria
Alchemical Studies (Carl Jung)
Aurora consurgens
Buch der heiligen Dreifaltigkeit
Cantong qi
Chymical Wedding of Christian Rosenkreutz
Hermetica
Emerald Tablet
Sirr al-khalīqa ("The Secret of Creation")
The Hermetical Triumph
Fasciculus Chemicus
Musaeum Hermeticum
Mutus Liber
Rosary of the Philosophers
Splendor Solis
Theatrum Chemicum
Theatrum Chemicum Britannicum
The Mirror of Alchimy
Turba Philosophorum

Journals
Ambix
Aries
Early Science and Medicine
Isis

Alchemists 
 

The most influential names in the history of alchemy include:
Hermes Trismegistus – by tradition, the founder of Western alchemy; many alchemical works were attributed to him.
Wei Boyang – authored the earliest known book on theoretical alchemy in China.
Pseudo-Democritus – anonymous author of the oldest extant works of Greco-Egyptian alchemy.
Zosimos of Panopolis – influential Greco-Egyptian alchemist.
Khālid ibn Yazīd – credited with introducing alchemy to the Islamic world.
Pseudo-Apollonius of Tyana – earliest known source of the sulfur-mercury theory of metals and the Emerald Tablet.
Jābir ibn Hayyān – notable for the theory of the balance (ʿilm al-mīzān),  the theory of artificial generation (ʿilm al-takwīn), and a general emphasis on experimental science.
Pseudo-Geber – later Latin alchemist who wrote the influential Summa perfectionis.
Roger Bacon – staunch proponent of the use of alchemy.
Paracelsus – developer of iatrochemistry.
Robert Boyle – alchemist critical of Paracelsus, credited as the father of modern chemistry.
Mary Anne Atwood – key figure in the occult revival of alchemy.
Carl Jung – merged alchemy and psychoanalytic thought.

See also 
 Outline of chemistry
 Outline of medicine

External links 

 SHAC: Society for the History of Alchemy and Chemistry
 ESSWE: European Society for the Study of Western Esotericism
 Association for the Study of Esotericism
 The Alchemy Website. – Adam McLean's online collections and academic discussion.
 Inner Garden Alchemy Research Group: a non-profit foundation that aims to transmit the alchemical tradition.
 
 Dictionary of the History of Ideas: Alchemy
 Book of Secrets: Alchemy and the European Imagination, 1500-2000 – A digital exhibition from the Beinecke Rare Book and Manuscript Library at Yale University

 
Alchemy
Alchemy